Holi is a 2002 Indian Telugu-language romantic drama film starring Uday Kiran and Richa Pallod in the lead roles.

Cast 

 Uday Kiran as Kiran
 Richa Pallod as Sandhya / "Chinni" (credited as Richa Sharma)
 Sunil as Raja (refers to himself as C, C++, Java and Oracle)
 L. B. Sriram
 Banerjee
 Sudha
 Chalapati Rao as Sandhya's father 
 Chandra Mohan
 Rajashree as Vasanthi
 Sri Lakshmi
 Swetha
 Kavitha
 Raghu Kunche as Sekhar
 Giri Babu
 Rashmi Gautam as Shalu
 Mink Brar as an item number in "Chamak Cham"

Soundtrack 
R. P. Patnaik composed eights songs for the film. In an audio review, Sreya Sunil wrote that "RP Patnaik comes out with some impressive, some average to above average songs".
 "Ounani" - R. P. Patnaik
 "Priyathama" - KK
 "Aadapillalu" - KK, Kavita Krishnamurthy
 "O Cheliya" - KK, Sadhana Sargam
 "Nee Manasu" - R. P. Patnaik,  Sadhana Sargam
 "Chamaku Chamak" - Suneeta Rao
 "Life is Beautiful" - UK Uday Kiran, Anoop
 "Chinthamani" - R. P. Patnaik, Sunil

Release 
The film released to mixed reviews. Initially movie ran average in theatres but was a huge hit in television, especially for songs. Jeevi of Idlebrain.com gave the film three and a half of five stars and praised the performances of the new age concept, lead actors, the songs, and the cinematography. Gudipoodi Srihari of The Hindu wrote that "This is another love story, but for a change deals with responsible love and happy ending".

References

External links

2000s Telugu-language films
Indian romantic drama films
2002 romantic drama films
2002 films